Since 1964, various animated and live-action theatrically released films based on Hanna-Barbera cartoons have been created and released to theaters. While alive, Joseph Barbera and William Hanna (the founders of Hanna-Barbera) were involved with each production in some capacity.

Theatrical films list

Direct-to-video and TV movies 

  Tom and Jerry: Spy Quest is based on both Jonny Quest and Tom and Jerry. However, Tom and Jerry are not considered to be Hanna-Barbera Productions characters since they were created by William Hanna and Joseph Barbera while both men were employed by Metro-Goldwyn-Mayer cartoon studio. Because of this, there are no other Tom and Jerry Feature films and DTV films included on this list.

See also 
 List of Scooby-Doo media
 List of The Flintstones media

References 

List of films
Hanna-Barbara
Hanna-Barbera
Hanna-Barbera animated films
Lists of films based on works